Stamping Creek is a stream in the U.S. state of West Virginia.

Some say the creek was descriptively named for the sounds its makes, while others believe former buffalo stampedes account for the name.

See also
List of rivers of West Virginia

References

Rivers of Pocahontas County, West Virginia
Rivers of West Virginia